Soufiane Sankhon (born 18 July 1974) is a French karateka who won a silver medal in the men's kumite in the -65 kg weight class at the 1999 European Karate Championships and two bronze medals in the men's kumite -65 kg weight class at the 1998 and 2000 European Karate Championships.

References

French male karateka
Living people
1974 births
Place of birth missing (living people)
21st-century French people
20th-century French people